Charles Bruce, 5th Earl of Elgin and 9th Earl of Kincardine (6 July 1732 – 14 May 1771) was the son of William Bruce, 8th Earl of Kincardine. His mother was Janet Roberton, daughter of James Roberton (principal Lord of Session) and great-granddaughter of advocate and judge Lord Bedlay

On 1 June 1759, he married Martha Whyte (1739–1810), who later became governess to Princess Charlotte of Wales. They had eight children:
Lady Martha Bruce (b. 3 June 1760), died young
Lady Janet Bruce (b. 2 July 1761), died young
William Robert Bruce, Lord Bruce (b. 15 January 1763), died young
William Robert Bruce, 6th Earl of Elgin (1764–1771)
Thomas Bruce, 7th Earl of Elgin (1766–1841)
Charles Andrew Bruce (1768–1810), Governor of Prince of Wales's Island
James Bruce (1769–1798), Member of Parliament
Lady Charlotte Matilda Bruce (28 May 1771 – March 1816), married Admiral Philip Charles Durham

Elgin was Grand Master of Scottish Freemasons from 1761 to 1763 and a founding member of the Royal and Ancient Golf Club of St Andrews. He built the planned industrial village of Charlestown, Fife.

He is buried in the southern transept of Dunfermline Abbey close to the grave of Robert the Bruce. In 1812, Scottish composer Magdalene Stirling named her Charles Bruce Reel after him.

References

1732 births
1771 deaths
5
9
Charles